Chidley Coote was an Irish politician.

Coote was educated at Trinity College, Dublin.

He sat in the Irish House of Commons as a Member of Parliament (MP) for Kilmallock from 1695 to 1703, serving with Standish Hartstonge. Among his sons were the soldier Eyre and priest Charles.

References 

Members of the Parliament of Ireland (pre-1801) for County Limerick constituencies
Irish MPs 1776–1783
Alumni of Trinity College Dublin